Liu Xingyuan (October 1908 – August 14, 1990) was a lieutenant general in the People's Liberation Army and People's Republic of China politician. Born in Shandong Province. He was Chinese Communist Party Committee Secretary (March 1972 – October 1975) and governor (March 1972 – October 1975) of Sichuan Province. He was Chinese Communist Party Committee Secretary (December 1970 – March 1972) and governor (June 1969 – March 1972) of Guangdong Province.

1908 births
1990 deaths
People's Republic of China politicians from Shandong
Chinese Communist Party politicians from Shandong
People's Liberation Army generals from Shandong
Governors of Sichuan
Political office-holders in Sichuan
Governors of Guangdong
Political office-holders in Guangdong
Members of the 9th Central Committee of the Chinese Communist Party